N39  may refer to:
 , a submarine of the Royal Netherlands Navy
 Iwaidja language
 Nebraska Highway 39, in the United States
 Northrop N-39, an American prototype aircraft